California's 73rd State Assembly district is one of 80 California State Assembly districts. It is currently represented by Republican Laurie Davies of Laguna Niguel.

District profile 
The district encompasses much of southern Orange County, stretching from the coast to the Santa Ana Mountains. The affluent district consists of a mix of longstanding towns on the shore and planned communities in the hills.

Orange County - 15.3%
Aliso Viejo
Coto de Caza
Dana Point
Ladera Ranch
Laguna Hills
Laguna Niguel
Las Flores
Mission Viejo
Rancho Santa Margarita
San Clemente
San Juan Capistrano

Election results from statewide races

List of Assembly Members 
Due to redistricting, the 73rd district has been moved around different parts of the state. The current iteration resulted from the 2011 redistricting by the California Citizens Redistricting Commission.

Election results 1992 - present

2022

2020

2018

2016

2014

2012

2010

2008

2006

2004

2002

2000

1998

1996

1994

1992

See also 
 California State Assembly
 California State Assembly districts
 Districts in California

References

External links 
 District map from the California Citizens Redistricting Commission

73
Government in Orange County, California
Aliso Viejo, California
Dana Point, California
Laguna Hills, California
Laguna Niguel, California
Mission Viejo, California
San Clemente, California
San Juan Capistrano, California